Joshua Lawrence “Jake” Adelstein (born March 28, 1969) is an American journalist, crime writer, and blogger who has spent most of his career in Japan. He is the author of Tokyo Vice: An American Reporter on the Police Beat in Japan., which inspired HBO Max's 2022 television series of the same name starring Ansel Elgort as Adelstein.

Career
Adelstein grew up in Columbia, Missouri and graduated from Rock Bridge High School. He moved to Japan at age 19 to study Japanese literature at Sophia University. In 1993, Adelstein became the first non-Japanese staff writer at the Yomiuri Shimbun newspaper, where he worked for 12 years.

After leaving the Yomiuri, Adelstein published an exposé of how an alleged crime boss, Tadamasa Goto, made a deal with the FBI to gain entry to the United States for a liver transplant at the University of California Los Angeles (UCLA). In 2009, Adelstein published a memoir about his career as a reporter in Japan, Tokyo Vice, in which he accused Goto of threatening to kill him over the story. There have been many doubts about the veracity of the tales described in the memoir.

Adelstein was subsequently a reporter for a United States Department of State investigation into human trafficking in Japan, and now writes for the Daily Beast, Vice News, The Japan Times and other publications. He is a board member and advisor to the Lighthouse: Center for Human Trafficking Victims (formerly Polaris Project Japan).

On April 19, 2011, Adelstein filed a lawsuit against National Geographic Television, which had hired him to help make a documentary about the yakuza, citing ethical problems with their behaviour in Japan.  Adelstein withdrew the lawsuit a month later, after reaching a settlement.

Works

References

Further reading 
 Hessler, Peter (9 January 2012). "All Due Respect". The New Yorker, Volume LXXXVII, No. 43, pp. 50–59.
 Book Break: Robert Whiting and Jake Adelstein - “Beyond Tokyo’s Vices And The Underworld”, 16 March 2022, Foreign Correspondents' Club of Japan

External links
 Profile on Goodreads.com
 

American crime reporters
American male journalists
American expatriates in Japan
American non-fiction crime writers
Japanese-language writers
Jewish American writers
Journalists from Missouri
Living people
Organized crime in Japan
Writers from Columbia, Missouri
Rock Bridge High School alumni
1969 births
21st-century American Jews